USS YDG-5 was a degaussing vessel of the United States Navy (USN) and formerly an auxiliary minesweeper operated by the Royal Australian Navy (RAN) during World War II.

She was built by Ernst Wright, Tuncurry, New South Wales and launched in 1936 for the North Coast Steam Navigation Company as the TSS Nambucca. Nambucca was requisitioned by the RAN on 7 November 1939 and converted to an auxiliary minesweeper, and commissioned on 10 January 1940 as HMAS Nambucca (NB). She formed part of Minesweeping Group 50 based in Sydney, undertaking minesweeping activities around Wilsons Promontory and Cape Otway. She was transferred to the USN on 19 April 1943.

After conversion to a degaussing vessel by Evans Deakin and Company, Brisbane, she was commissioned on 31 July 1944 as USS YDG-5. She was decommissioned on 7 February 1946 and was destroyed by fire on 8 February.

Notes

References
 

1936 ships
Ships built in New South Wales
Degaussing ships of the United States Navy
Wooden steamships of Australia
Coastal trading vessels of Australia